The AWA Superstars of Wrestling International Heavyweight Championship was a professional wrestling championship in the AWA Superstars of Wrestling promotion.

AWA Superstars of Wrestling's version of the AWA International Heavyweight Championship was created in 1999, claiming the lineage of the original International Heavyweight Championship of the American Wrestling Association (AWA). However, in 2007 World Wrestling Entertainment (WWE) sued AWA Superstars of Wrestling promoter Dale Gagner over his use of the AWA name, which WWE owned. After the lawsuit, AWA Superstars of Wrestling ignored the reigns of the original AWA and only champions from 1996 onward were recognized.

Title history

See also
AWA International Heavyweight Championship

References

Heavyweight wrestling championships
International professional wrestling championships